Domingo Bordaberry Elizondo (1889–1952) was a Uruguayan lawyer and political figure.

Early career

Bordaberry was a lawyer by profession.

He became a farm manager and subsequently a landowner.

Senator

Bordaberry served as a Senator under the sponsorship of the Colorado Party (Uruguay); he was regarded as one of its more conservative members, and also acted as somewhat of a bridge to the Blanco Party, being strongly identified, with the Blanco Benito Nardone and others, with the defence of rural interests, and was particularly expert on livestock matters.

He was particularly linked with the 'Riverista' current of opinion within the Colorado Party (Uruguay), although his record for political cooperation reached much beyond that Party.

With Nardone, he was also heavily involved in the development of radio broadcasting for rural Uruguay, as co-owner of CX 4 Radio Rural.

Family background

Domingo Bordaberry was the son of Santiago Bordaberry Senior, a French national from the Northern Basque Country.

Domingo Bordaberry's son Juan María Bordaberry served with him in a prominent Ruralist organization and later became President of Uruguay in 1972.

A grandson, Pedro Bordaberry, was to serve as a minister in the government of Jorge Batlle.

Another grandson, Santiago Bordaberry, was to be prominent in Ruralist leadership.

Political heritage

Domingo Bordaberry may be said to have contributed to a distinct tendency within Uruguayan political culture in that he and his son Juan María Bordaberry, standing apart somewhat from the Montevideo-based political life, also succeeded by one means or another in garnering at least limited support from both of the formerly mutually antagonistic National (Blanco) and Colorado parties. (This antagonism may be understood in the context of the intermittent Civil War which occurred throughout much of the 19th century.) The wide personal political support commanded in recent years by his grandson Pedro Bordaberry, himself a former government minister, which reaches beyond the lately low poll percentages received by the formerly dominant Colorado Party (Uruguay), is thus arguably not beyond the context of an apparent capacity to unify support from diverse parts of the Uruguayan party spectrum inherited in some measure from Domingo Bordaberry. The relevance of this capacity for cooperation, particularly for the second round of the more recent Presidential elections, between the National and Colorado Parties, has been made more acute by the greatly increased electoral support in recent years for the Frente Amplio grouping.

See also

 Politics of Uruguay
 List of political families#Uruguay
 Colorado Party (Uruguay)#Post 2004: defeat at polls and rise of Pedro Bordaberry
 Pedro Bordaberry#Riverista resurgence
 Benito Nardone#Ruralist involvement with the Bordaberrys

References
 :es:Domingo Bordaberry

Uruguayan people of Basque descent
1889 births
1952 deaths
20th-century Uruguayan lawyers
Colorado Party (Uruguay) politicians
Members of the Senate of Uruguay
Uruguayan cattlemen